Əhmədoba (also, Ahmedoba) is a village and municipality in the Khachmaz District of Azerbaijan.  It has a population of 1,548. The municipality consists of the villages of Ahmedoba, Garajally, Hajiahmedoba, and Hajigazma.

References 

Populated places in Khachmaz District